Calanticidae is a family of acorn barnacles in the order Calanticomorpha. There are about 12 genera and more than 60 described species in Calanticidae.

Genera
These genera belong to the family Calanticidae:

 Aurivillialepas Newman, 1980
 Calantica Gray, 1825
 Crosnieriella Jones, 1998
 Euscalpellum Hoek, 1907
 Gruvelialepas Newman, 1980
 Newmanilepas Zevina & Yakhontova, 1987
 Paracalantica (Utinomi, 1949)
 Pisiscalpellum Utinomi, 1958
 Scillaelepas Seguenza, 1872
 Smilium Gray, 1825
 † Pachyscalpellum Buckeridge, 1991
 † Zeascalpellum Buckeridge, 1983

References

External links

Barnacles
Crustacean families